Tooned is an animated cartoon by McLaren starring Jenson Button, Fernando Alonso and comedian Alexander Armstrong, and formerly Lewis Hamilton, Kevin Magnussen and Sergio Pérez. It was aired on Sky Sports F1 before the start of each Formula One race. The first season, which starred former McLaren driver Lewis Hamilton aired from the 2012 British Grand Prix onwards. The second season aired from the 2013 British Grand Prix onwards. All episodes can be watched on McLaren's YouTube channel and the Sky Sports F1 website any time after the premiere. The episodes are a little more than 3 minutes long. On 16 May 2014 it was announced on McLaren's YouTube channel that a season 3 was in progress. It was announced when Jenson Button was shown a picture of his 2014 team mate Kevin Magnussen's character on Tooned and also added that 'the production of Season 3 was going well'. It was announced by McLaren on 19 October 2016 that Tooned would be making a return, featuring Fernando Alonso, Stoffel Vandoorne, and possibly Button.

Development
Tooned was created by John Allert, the McLaren Group brand and marketing director. The show was written, directed and produced by Chris Waitt, Simon Whalley and Henry Trotter at visual effects house Framestore.

Characters

Main characters

Season One (2012)
 Lewis Hamilton as Lewis, one of McLaren's star racing drivers. He loves racing, finds engineering and testing boring, and rarely listens to Professor M. He appears in episodes 1–7, picture appearance in episode 8, 9–10, makes his final appearance in episode 12, where it is said that he disappeared and was replaced by Sergio Pérez.
 Jenson Button as Jenson, McLaren's other star driver. Like Lewis, he loves racing and is bored by testing, and is amused by Lewis' antics. He appears in episode 1–10 and 12.
 Alexander Armstrong as Professor M, McLaren's head of engineering. He has little patience for Lewis and Jenson, and is completely oblivious to the way they find his testing programmes boring. Armstrong described M as a blend of Steve Jobs and Q but not anyone specific. He appears in every episode of the series.

Season Two (2013) - in addition to above
 Jenson Button as Jenson, now McLaren's star driver following the departure of Lewis Hamilton to Mercedes.
 Sergio Pérez as Sergio. He joined the team and the cast of Tooned from 2013. Lewis' departure to Mercedes and replacement by Pérez was written into the final episode of the first season. He left the team and the cast at the end of the 2013 season.
 Brian Cox as The Mechanic with No Name, a little old Scotsman who tells the people at the McLaren Technology Centre 'The Real Story of McLaren' which Professor M disapproves of. He appears in every episode of series 2.

Renewed Season Three (2016)

Mobil 1 Series (2013)
 Tony Stewart as Smoke, from NASCAR.  He co-owns the Mobil 1-sponsored teams of Stewart-Haas Racing and drove the No. 14 car before a season-ending injury in real life.

Mobil 1 Series 2 – Oil (2014)
 Kevin Magnussen as Kevin, McLaren's up and coming rookie.

Other characters 
 The Mechanics appear in almost every episode. They are always kept occupied by Professor M, but never speak. The head mechanic is Charlie McRae. They appear in episodes 1–11.
 The Tour Guide appears in the first four episodes of the first season, showing tour groups around the McLaren team headquarters. She often shows off memorabilia from some of the team's famous drivers.
 Baron von Richtmacher was Professor M's rival when M was racing. While von Richtmacher was the faster driver, M's intelligence and appreciation for engineering saw him win. He appears in episode 5.
 The Mayoress of Woking is the mayor of Woking, the town in which McLaren is based. She appears as a little old lady, and Professor M wrongfully assumes that she knows nothing of engineering. She appears in Episode 6. However if the Tooned DVD is bought, an episode hidden in the extra features portrays exactly the same episode on with the Mayoress replaced by the Queen of the UK.
 MP4 RTD-1 (also known as the McLaren Project 4 Robot Test Driver) is a robot developed by Professor M to be the perfect test driver. RTD-1 appears in episode 7, along with MP4-RPM1 (a robot avatar of Professor M sent along because the real M expected Lewis and Jenson's antics to have something go wrong).
 Nyck de Vries as Nyck, a member of the McLaren driver development programme. He is young and eager to drive a Formula One car, but is often forced to sit through M's lessons, which he finds boring. Nyck appears in episodes 8 and 11.
 Mika Häkkinen as Mika, the 1998 and 1999 Formula One World Drivers' Champion. Mika insists that he is retired from racing, but it does not take much persuasion from Lewis and Jenson to convince him to start racing again. He appears in episode 10. It is revealed in Season 2 that he is an Intergalactic Super Hero from planet Sisu; at the end of the season 2 episode fellow Finnish McLaren driver Kimi Räikkönen is assumed to be the same.
 Ron Dennis as Ron Dennis, the Executive Chairman of the McLaren group. He is styled as a faceless James Bond villain, with a talking parrot, Cosworth. He appears in episode 12.

Series overview

Episodes

Season 1 (2012)
The first season comprises the following 12 episodes.

Season 2 (2013)
The second season comprised eight episodes, bringing the total number of episodes to twenty. Based on McLaren's 50th Anniversary, Season 2 was written by Chris Waitt, Henry Trotter, Ed Dyson and Tim Bain.

Season 3 (2013)

Season 4 (2014)

Season 5 (2016)

Mobil 1 series
A special series of Tooned was produced in partnership with Mobil 1. It stars Jenson, Checo, Professor M and a new character, Smoke (former NASCAR drivers' and owners' champion Tony Stewart. In this series, Professor M is hired in by Mobil 1 to explain the history of oil and lubricants and Jenson, Checo, and Smoke are used as demonstrators. The episodes are available on YouTube, and six episodes have been developed.

Promotion
The Tooned logo was added to the back of the McLaren MP4-27 and McLaren MP4-28's rear wings from the 2012 Hungarian Grand Prix to the 2013 Bahrain Grand Prix. A DVD of series 1 was released on 10 December 2012.

References

2010s British animated television series
2012 British television series debuts
British children's animated comedy television series
British children's animated sports television series
British computer-animated television series
McLaren Group
Formula One mass media
Animated television series about auto racing
Television shows scored by Natalie Holt